Nicholas John Sinnott (December 6, 1870 – July 20, 1929) was an American lawyer and politician who served as a United States representative from Oregon from 1913 to 1928. He was later appointed by President Calvin Coolidge to be a Judge on the Court of Claims, serving from 1928 to 1929.

Education and career

Sinnott was born on December 6, 1870, in The Dalles, Wasco County, Oregon. His father, Colonel N. B. Sinnott, was the founder of the old Umatilla House in The Dalles, his mother was Mary Brass Sinnott. He attended the public schools and the Wasco Independent Academy at The Dalles. He received an Artium Baccalaureus degree in 1892 from the University of Notre Dame and read law with Alfred S. Bennett in 1895. He was admitted to the bar and entered private practice in The Dalles from 1885 to 1912. He served as a Republican member of the Oregon State Senate from Wasco County from 1909 to 1913, being elected in 1909 and 1911.

Congressional service

Sinnott was elected as a Republican to the United States House of Representatives of the 63rd United States Congress and to the seven succeeding Congresses and served from March 4, 1913, until his resignation effective May 31, 1928. He was Chairman of the United States House Committee on Public Lands for the 66th through 70th United States Congresses and of the United States House Committee on Patents for the 70th United States Congress. While in the House he worked to create and enlarge water reclamation projects in Eastern Oregon.

Federal judicial service

Sinnott was nominated by President Calvin Coolidge on April 18, 1928, to a seat on the Court of Claims (later the United States Court of Claims) vacated by Judge Fenton Whitlock Booth. He was confirmed by the United States Senate on April 20, 1928, and received his commission the same day. His service terminated on July 20, 1929, due to his death in Washington, D.C. He was interred in St. Peters Cemetery in The Dalles.

Personal

In 1901, Sinnott married Dora Purcell, and they would have six children.

Honor

The Sinnott Memorial Observation Station and museum at Crater Lake National Park was dedicated in Sinnott's honor on July 16, 1931.

See also 
 List of United States representatives from Oregon

References

Sources

External links
 

1870 births
1929 deaths
People from The Dalles, Oregon
Republican Party Oregon state senators
University of Notre Dame alumni
Judges of the United States Court of Claims
United States Article I federal judges appointed by Calvin Coolidge
20th-century American judges
Republican Party members of the United States House of Representatives from Oregon